The Montreal Sasquatch were a team of the Premier Basketball League (PBL) that played in the 2008–09 season under two different ownership groups.

History
Réal Bourassa was granted an expansion franchise in the PBL for the 2009 season.  However, on February 5, 2009, the PBL canceled the franchise after it emerged that players weren't being paid. A dispersal draft of Sasquatch players was then conducted.

On February 11, the PBL announced that Soar Enterprises, another ownership group, would take over the franchise and play the remainder of the season.  The squad was to be known as Team Montreal as Bourassa retained the rights to the name Sasquatch.

The Sasquatch were one of four teams in the PBL Atlantic Division that enhanced their 20-game PBL schedule with 6 exhibitions to compete for the "Champlain Cup."  When the Sasquatch were removed from the league, the other teams decided that the remaining, unplayed exhibitions involving the Sasquatch would be treated as forfeits.

The PBL, which arranged all league travel, intervened heavily to ensure that the next three road games took place.  However, the venue arranged for the reconstituted team's first home game, on February 27, fell through; the visiting Halifax Rainmen objected to an alternate gym and the PBL ruled that it did not meet league standards.  A home game against Wilmington the next day was likewise cancelled, and the remaining home games were played at the opponent's venue.

2009 roster

First half
This is the Sasquatch roster before the PBL removed the Sasquatch from the league.

Head Coach: Alejandro Hasbani

In the PBL dispersal draft four players were selected:
 Randy Gill by the Detroit Panthers
 John Ruffus by the Quebec Kebs (traded to Manchester on March 9)
 Xavier Morton by the Rochester RazorSharks
 Jamaal Wise by the Manchester Millrats (traded to Quebec on March 9)

All other Sasquatch players were given their unconditional release and became free agents.

Second half
Head Coach: Tito Destin

2009 season schedule

*  Originally a home game for Montreal

See also
Premier Basketball League
Canada Basketball
Canadian Interuniversity Sport
Canadian Colleges Athletic Association
Montreal

References

External links
 Official Site
 News release announcing Sasquatch's entry

Former Premier Basketball League teams
Sas
Defunct basketball teams in Canada
Basketball teams established in 2008
Basketball teams disestablished in 2009
2008 establishments in Quebec
2009 disestablishments in Quebec